Dorchester County is the name of two counties in the United States:

 Dorchester County, Maryland
 Dorchester County, South Carolina